Steffi van Wyk-Brink (born 23 October 1991) is a Namibian model and beauty pageant titleholder who represented Namibia at the Miss World 2015 pageant.

Early life and education 
Van Wyk is from Otjiwarongo and grew up on a farm. She attended Jan Mohr Secondary School in Windhoek. She studied further in South Africa.

Career

Van Wyk was a sports organiser and a part-time fitness instructor at Jan Mohr Secondary School, her former high school. Her contract with the school, however, expired in August 2015. After August 2015, van Wyk devoted time to prepare for her title as Miss Namibia 2015.

In August 2015, van Wyk won the title of Miss Namibia. The pageant was held in Windhoek, Namibia. Van Wyk represented Namibia and competed at Miss World 2015.

Van Wyk is a fitness instructor and body builder. She co-owns Brink Fit, a sports, fitness, and wellness company, with her husband.

Van Wyk was a contestant on 2019's Survivor South Africa: Island of Secrets. Van Wyk competed in Survivor South Africa: Return of the Outcasts.

Personal life
In August 2016, van Wyk married Clint Brink, a South African actor. They live in Johannesburg.

See also 

 Miss Namibia

References

External links
Official Miss Namibia website

Living people
1991 births
Miss World 2015 delegates
Namibian beauty pageant winners
Namibian expatriates in South Africa
People from Otjiwarongo
People from Windhoek